Clyde Kimball (born July 11, 1942) is an American politician. He served as a Democratic member of the Louisiana House of Representatives.

Life and career 
Kimball attended Louisiana State University.

In 1976, Kimball was elected to the Louisiana House of Representatives, serving until 1992.

References 

1942 births
Living people
Democratic Party members of the Louisiana House of Representatives
20th-century American politicians
Louisiana State University alumni